Monkland Priory was a priory in Monkland, Herefordshire, England at .

References

Monasteries in Herefordshire